Brian Ivan Cobb Norton (10 October 1899 – 16 July 1956), nicknamed "Babe", was a South African tennis player. He was born in Cape Colony and died in Santa Clara, California. At Wimbledon 1921, Norton beat Frank Hunter and Manuel Alonso Areizaga, before having two championship points in the Challenge Round against Bill Tilden but losing in five sets. Norton is one of only two men to hold championship point in a Grand Slam men's singles final and yet not win a title (the other was Guillermo Coria at the 2004 French Open). Norton won the 1923 U.S. National Championships doubles, alongside Tilden. In the singles that year, Norton beat R. Norris Williams in a five-set quarterfinal, then lost to Tilden in the semifinals.

After Norton, the next South African citizen to reach the gentlemen's singles final at Wimbledon would be Kevin Anderson 97 years later in 2018. Although another South African-born tennis player, Kevin Curren, had reached the Wimbledon final in 1985 against Boris Becker (Germany), Curren played as a U.S. (American) citizen. 

He competed in the singles and doubles events at the 1920 Summer Olympics. Norton was ranked World No. 7 by A. Wallis Myers of The Daily Telegraph in 1921 and 1922.

In 1921, he won the singles title at the South of England Championships after a five-set victory in the final against Mohammed Sleem.

Grand Slam finals

Singles (1 runner-up)

Doubles (1 title)

References

External links
 
 
 
 
 

1899 births
1956 deaths
Cape Colony people
South African male tennis players
Grand Slam (tennis) champions in men's doubles
Tennis players at the 1920 Summer Olympics
Olympic tennis players of South Africa
United States National champions (tennis)
Professional tennis players before the Open Era
South African emigrants to the United States